Massachusetts House of Representatives' 5th Barnstable district in the United States is one of 160 legislative districts included in the lower house of the Massachusetts General Court. It covers parts of Barnstable County and Plymouth County. Since 2021, Steven Xiarhos of the Republican Party has represented the district.

Towns represented
The district includes the following localities:
 part of Barnstable
 part of Bourne
 Sandwich
 part of Plymouth

The current district geographic boundary overlaps with those of the Massachusetts Senate's Cape and Islands and Plymouth and Barnstable districts.

Representatives
 Jeffrey Davis Perry
 Randy Hunt
 Steven Xiarhos

See also
 List of Massachusetts House of Representatives elections
 List of Massachusetts General Courts
 List of former districts of the Massachusetts House of Representatives

References

Further reading

External links
 Ballotpedia. Massachusetts House of Representatives Fifth Barnstable District
  (State House district information based on U.S. Census Bureau's American Community Survey).

House
Government of Barnstable County, Massachusetts